Java-eiland (literally, "Java Island") is a neighbourhood of Amsterdam, Netherlands. It is located on a peninsula, surrounded on three sides by water and on the east by the KNSM Island neighbourhood.

History 

The peninsula was created by dredging water at the end of the 19th century and was used for shipping services. The Stoomvaart Maatschappij Nederland was located here which ran services to the Dutch East Indies. After the Second World War and the 1945 independence of Indonesia, trade nearly came to a standstill. In the 1980s, squatters, artists and the homeless had taken over many of the buildings in the area. The name "Java Island" was given to the area when it was designated for housing in the 1990s.

In the 1990s the area was transformed into residential units according to a master plan by Amsterdam architect Sjoerd Soeters. Except for one building owned by port authorities, all the old buildings were razed. As for transport, tram line 7 terminates at Azartplein (Azart Square), on the eastern edge of Java-eiland.

Notable architecture includes four small canals with post-modernist canal houses from various architects, cycle and pedestrian bridges by Guy Rombouts and Monica Droste, and at the Azartplein two building by the Swiss architectural firm Diener & Diener.

References

Neighbourhoods of Amsterdam
Amsterdam-Oost